Corythoxestis pentarcha is a moth of the family Gracillariidae. It is known from Réunion, Malaysia, and Sri Lanka. The hostplants for the species include Coffea robusta and Amomum magnificum.

Subspecies
Corythoxestis pentarcha pentarcha
Corythoxestis pentarcha borbonica Guillermet, 2011 (Réunion)

References

Moths described in 1922
Phyllocnistinae
Moths of Réunion
Moths of Malaysia
Moths of Sri Lanka